A vertical-lift bridge or just lift bridge is a type of movable bridge in which a span rises vertically while remaining parallel with the deck.

The vertical lift offers several benefits over other movable bridges such as the bascule and swing-span bridges.  Generally speaking, they cost less to build for longer moveable spans.  The counterweights in a vertical lift are only required to be equal to the weight of the deck, whereas bascule bridge counterweights must weigh several times as much as the span being lifted.  As a result, heavier materials can be used in the deck, and so this type of bridge is especially suited for heavy railroad use. The biggest disadvantage to the vertical-lift bridge (in comparison with many other designs) is the height restriction for vessels passing under it, due to the deck remaining suspended above the passageway.

Although most vertical-lift bridges use towers, each equipped with counterweights, some use hydraulic jacks located below the deck. An example is the  span bridge at St Paul Avenue in Milwaukee (see also table bridges). Another design used balance beams to lift the deck, with pivoting bascules located on the top of the lift towers. An example of this kind was built at La Salle in Illinois, United States.

Examples
See List of vertical-lift bridges.

Gallery of images

See also 
 Moveable bridges for a list of other movable bridge types 
 Submersible bridge for a similar disappearing bridge
 Table bridge for a vertical-lift bridge without visible lifting means

References

Bibliography

External links
 

 
Bridges by structural type

it:Ponte#Ponte sollevabile